Princess Bajrakitiyabha of Thailand, the Princess Rajasarini Siribajra (also known as Princess Pa or Patty, born 7 December 1978) is a Thai princess and diplomat of Thailand, the first grandchild of King Bhumibol and Queen Sirikit of Thailand, and the only one of the seven children of King Maha Vajiralongkorn born to his first wife Princess Soamsawali.

Early life and education 

Princess Bajrakitiyabha was born on 7 December 1978 at Amphorn Sathan Residential Hall, Dusit Palace in Bangkok.  She is the eldest child and first daughter of Vajiralongkorn and his first wife princess Soamsawali.  She studied at the all-girls Rajini School when she was in elementary and junior high school. She moved to England and began her secondary education first at Heathfield School in Ascot, finishing at the Chitralada School.

Princess Bajrakitiyabha received an LL.B. degree from Thammasat University, as well as a B.A. degree in International Relations from Sukhothai Thammatirat University, both in 2000. She subsequently obtained an LL.M. degree from Cornell Law School in 2002 and a J.S.D. degree from Cornell University in 2005.

On 12 May 2012, she was awarded an honorary LL.D. degree from IIT Chicago-Kent College of Law.

Career 
On completion of her legal education Princess Bajrakitiyabha worked briefly at the Thai Permanent Mission to the United Nations, in New York, before returning to Thailand. In September 2006, she was appointed Attorney in the Office of the Attorney General in Bangkok, and was then appointed to Office of the Attorney General of Udon Thani Province.

From 2012 to 2014, she was the Thai ambassador to Austria, until she returned to a post at the Office of the Attorney General.

On 3 February 2021, the princess was transferred from her position as an attorney in the Office of the Attorney General to the Royal Security Command in the position of Chief of Staff of The King's Close Bodyguard Command and bestowed the rank of general.

Work on women in the penal system
The princess was instrumental in prodding the Thai government to submit a resolution to the Commission on Crime Prevention and Criminal Justice, a subsidiary body of the UN Economic and Social Council, that detailed the vulnerability of women incarcerated in a system built principally for men. Her efforts were to lead to the UN adoption of the "Bangkok Rules", the first set of universal guidelines addressing the treatment of women in the justice system.

Bajrakitiyabha runs the "Kamlangjai" or "Inspire" project, which reaches out to incarcerated Thai women including pregnant inmates and their babies, and intends to assure those female and pregnant inmates are given adequate assistance to prepare them to reenter society upon release. She is also working on "Enhancing lives of Female Inmates" (ELFI), a project which proposes new rules for the treatment of women prisoners and non-custodial measures for women offenders as a supplement to the 1955 Standard Minimum Rules for the Treatment of Prisoners

Health

In December 2022, the Bureau of the Royal Household announced that the Princess had been hospitalised following a collapse while out walking her dogs on 14 December. The palace confirmed that it was due to a heart condition. The princess was initially taken to Pak Chong Nana Hospital and then transferred to the King Chulalongkorn Memorial Hospital. She was reportedly training her dogs for the Thailand Working Dog Championship 2022 organised by the Royal Thai Army.

Honours and symbols

Royal decorations

 : Dame of The Most Illustrious Order of the Royal House of Chakri
 : Dame of the Ancient and Auspicious Order of the Nine Gems
 : Dame Grand Cross of the Order of Chula Chom Klao, First Class
 : Dame Grand Cordon of the Order of the White Elephant
 : Dame Grand Cordon of the Order of the Crown of Thailand
 : Dame Grand Cross of the Order of the Direkgunabhorn
 : King Rama IX Royal Cypher Medal (First Class)
 : King Rama X Royal Cypher Medal (First Class)
 : Recipient of the Commemorative Medal on the Occasion of the Coronation of H.M. King Rama X

Foreign honour
 : Grand Decoration of Honour in Gold with Sash for Services to the Republic of Austria (7 October 2014)

Symbols

Ancestry

References

External links

  The Friend in need of "PA"'s website
 Kamlangjai Project website 
 The Children's Foundation, Phramongkutklao Hospital's website
 "ELFI" project
 Na Bha Foundation under HRH Princess Bajrakitiyabha's website
 Website, Office of the Attorney General, Thailand

1978 births
Living people
Thai female Phra Ong Chao
Thai people of Mon descent
Mahidol family
Cornell Law School alumni
Knights Grand Cordon of the Order of Chula Chom Klao
Dames Grand Cross of the Order of the Direkgunabhorn
Thammasat University alumni
Ambassadors of Thailand to Austria
People educated at Heathfield School, Ascot
Thai women diplomats
Thai women ambassadors
Children of Vajiralongkorn
21st-century Thai women
20th-century Chakri dynasty
21st-century Chakri dynasty
Daughters of kings